The events of 1967 in anime.

Releases

See also
1967 in animation

Births
 March 11 - Morio Asaka, director, storyboard artist, animator

External links 
Japanese animated works of the year, listed in the IMDb

Anime
Anime
Years in anime